The 2019–20 Mississippi State Bulldogs women's basketball team represented Mississippi State University during the 2019–20 NCAA Division I women's basketball season. The Bulldogs, led by eighth-year head coach Vic Schaefer, played their home games at Humphrey Coliseum as members of the Southeastern Conference (SEC).

The Bulldogs are coming off a 2019 NCAA Elite Eight loss to Oregon in which they lost 84–88.

At the conclusion of the season, Schaefer resigned to take the open coaching position at Texas.

Preseason

SEC media poll
The SEC media poll was released on October 15, 2019.

Roster

Rankings

^Coaches' Poll did not release a second poll at the same time as the AP.

Schedule

|-
!colspan=9 style=| Exhibition

|-
!colspan=9 style=| Non-conference regular season

|-
!colspan=9 style=| SEC regular season

|-
!colspan=9 style=| SEC Tournament

References

Mississippi State Bulldogs women's basketball seasons
Mississippi State
Mississippi State Bulldogs women's
Mississippi State Bulldogs women's